Magnolia Circuit was a street circuit set up on the motorway near the city of Szczecin, Poland. It operated from 1968 to 1976.

Description 
The circuit was a street circuit set up on the motorway near the city of Szczecin, Poland. Its surface consisted of parts made with asphalt, concrete, and basalt paving. It had 8 turns in total, 5 of which were in right and 3 in left.

History 
From 1968 to 1970, the circuit hosted the races of the Cup of Peace and Friendship. In 1968, the track hosted the race of the Polish Formula Three. From 1973 to 1976, it hosted the races of the Polish Auto Racing Championship tournament. The first elimination round of the Polish Auto Racing Championship, which took place between 22 and 23 May 1976 had been the last sports event to take place at the circuit. It had been attended by 10 000 people.

Race winners

Cup of Peace and Friendship 
 1968: Miroslav Fousek
 1969: Vladislav Ondřejík
 1970: Vladimír Hubáček

Polish Formula Three 
 1968: Miroslav Fousek

Notes

References 

Sports venues completed in 1969
Motorsport venues in Poland
Sports venues in West Pomeranian Voivodeship
Sport in Szczecin
Defunct motorsport venues
1969 establishments in Poland
1976 disestablishments in Poland